The 2017–18 Villanova Wildcats women's basketball team represents Villanova University in the 2017–18 NCAA Division I women's basketball season. The Wildcats, led by fortieth year head coach Harry Perretta, play their games at Jake Nevin Field House due to renovations at The Pavilion and were members of the Big East Conference. They finished the season 23–9, 12–6 in Big East play to finish in third place. They lost in the quarterfinals of the Big East women's tournament to Georgetown. They received an at-large bid to the NCAA women's tournament where they defeated South Dakota State in the first round before losing to Notre Dame in the second round.

Previous season
They finished the season 20–15, 11–7 in Big East play to finish in a tie for fourth place. They lost in the quarterfinals of the Big East women's tournament to St. John's. They were invited to the Women's National Invitation Tournament where they defeated Princeton, Drexel and James Madison in the first, second and third rounds, Indiana in the quarterfinals before losing to Michigan in the semifinals.

Roster

Schedule

|-
!colspan=9 style=| Exhibition

|-
!colspan=9 style=| Regular season

|-
!colspan=9 style=| Big East Women's Tournament

|-
!colspan=9 style=| NCAA Women's Tournament

Rankings
2017–18 NCAA Division I women's basketball rankings

See also
 2017–18 Villanova Wildcats men's basketball team

References

Villnova
Villanova Wildcats women's basketball seasons
Villanova
Villanova
Villanova